Drum memory was a magnetic data storage device invented by Gustav Tauschek in 1932 in Austria.  Drums were widely used in the 1950s and into the 1960s as computer memory.

Many early computers, called drum computers or drum machines, used drum memory as the main working memory of the computer.  Some drums were also used as secondary storage as for example various IBM drum storage drives.

Drums were displaced as primary computer memory by magnetic core memory, which offered a better balance of size, speed, cost, reliability and potential for further improvements.  Drums in turn were replaced by hard disk drives for secondary storage, which were both less expensive and offered denser storage. The manufacturing of drums ceased in the 1970s.

Technical design 
A drum memory or drum storage unit contained a large metal cylinder, coated on the outside surface with a ferromagnetic recording material. It could be considered the precursor to the hard disk drive (HDD), but in the form of a drum (cylinder) rather than a flat disk. In most designs, one or more rows of fixed read-write heads ran along the long axis of the drum, one for each track. The drum's controller simply selected the proper head and waited for the data to appear under it as the drum turned (rotational latency). Not all drum units were designed with each track having its own head. Some, such as the English Electric DEUCE drum and the UNIVAC FASTRAND had multiple heads moving a short distance on the drum in contrast to modern HDDs, which have one head per platter surface.

Magnetic drum units used as primary memory were addressed by word. Drum units used as secondary storage were addressed by block. Several modes of block addressing were possible, depending on the device.
Blocks took up an entire track and were addressed by track.
Tracks were divided into fixed length sectors and addressing was by track and sectors.
Blocks were variable length, and blocks were addressed by track and record number
Blocks were variable length with a key, and could be searched by key content.
Some devices were divided into logical cylinders, and addressing by track was actually logical cylinder and track.

The performance of a drum with one head per track is comparable to that of a disk with one head per track and is determined almost entirely by the rotational latency, whereas in an HDD with moving heads its performance includes a rotational latency delay plus the time to position the head over the desired track (seek time). In the era when drums were used as main working memory, programmers often did optimum programming—the programmer—or the assembler, e.g., Symbolic Optimal Assembly Program (SOAP)—positioned code on the drum in such a way as to reduce the amount of time needed for the next instruction to rotate into place under the head. They did this by timing how long it would take after loading an instruction for the computer to be ready to read the next one, then placing that instruction on the drum so that it would arrive under a head just in time. This method of timing-compensation, called the "skip factor" or "interleaving", was used for many years in storage memory controllers.

History 
Tauschek's original drum memory (1932) had a capacity of about 500,000 bits (62.5 kilobytes).

One of the earliest functioning computers to employ drum memory was the Atanasoff–Berry computer (1942). It stored 3,000 bits; however, it employed capacitance rather than magnetism to store the information.  The outer surface of the drum was lined with electrical contacts leading to capacitors contained within.

Magnetic drums were developed for the U.S. Navy during World War II with the work continuing at Engineering Research Associates (ERA) in 1946 and 1947.  An experimental ERA study was completed and reported to the Navy on June 19, 1947. Other early drum storage device development occurred at Birkbeck College (University of London), Harvard University, IBM and the University of Manchester. An ERA drum was the internal memory for the ATLAS-I computer delivered to the U.S. Navy in October 1950 and later sold commercially as the ERA 1101 and UNIVAC_1101. Through mergers, ERA became a division of UNIVAC shipping the Series 1100 drum as a part of the UNIVAC File Computer in 1956; each drum stored 180,000 6-bit characters (135 kilobytes).

The first mass-produced computer, the IBM 650, initially had up to 2,000 10-digit words, about 17.5 kilobytes, of drum memory (later doubled to 4,000 words, about 35 kilobytes, in the Model 4). As late as 1980, PDP-11/45 machines using magnetic core main memory and drums for swapping were still in use at many of the original UNIX sites.

In BSD Unix and its descendants,  was the name of the default virtual memory (swap) device, deriving from the use of drum secondary-storage devices as backup storage for pages in virtual memory.

Magnetic drum memory units were used in the Minuteman ICBM launch control centers from the beginning in the early 1960s until the REACT upgrades in the mid-1990s.

See also 
 CAB500
 Carousel memory (magnetic rolls)
 Karlqvist gap
 Manchester Mark 1
 Random-access memory
 Wisconsin Integrally Synchronized Computer

References

External links 

 The Story of Mel: the classic story about one programmer's drum machine hand-coding antics: Mel Kaye.
 Librascope LGP-30: The drum memory computer referenced in the above story, also referenced on Librascope LGP-30.
 Librascope RPC-4000: Another drum memory computer referenced in the above story
 Oral history interview with Dean Babcock

Computer memory
Computer storage devices
Non-volatile memory
Austrian inventions